The Gibraltar national under-17 football team is the youth football team of Gibraltar, run by the Gibraltar Football Association. The team is based mostly on the young players from the region's domestic leagues, the Gibraltar Premier Division and Gibraltar Second Division, and competes every year to qualify for the European Under-17 Football Championship.

History 
The team played its first match on 24 October 2013 against the Republic of Ireland national under-17 football team, the year when Gibraltar became a member of UEFA. George Wink, then of the Juvenil team of the Spanish club Club Atlético Zabal, scored the first goal, in the history of the national under-17 team on October 28, 2013 against the Armenia national under-17 football team.

The side would finish bottom of the group on every campaign since, scoring only 5 goals in response, with George Wink becoming the record goalscorer at any level of football in Gibraltar until Jake Gosling and Lee Casciaro equalled the record for the seniors in 2015. In May 2017, a re-organization of management throughout the Gibraltar Football Association saw coach Stephen Head step up to manage the U19 team, with David Ochello appointed as his replacement. The following campaign saw Gibraltar suffer a record 10-0 defeat to Norway on the 4th anniversary of their debut in the competition.

8 years after their first matches as UEFA members, Gibraltar finally secured their first win at under-17 level with a 2-1 friendly win over Faroe Islands on 10 September 2021.

Match record

FIFA World Cup

UEFA European Championship

Recent results and fixtures

Squad

Current squad

For the 2023 UEFA European Under-17 Championship qualification and finals, players born on or after 1 January 2006 are eligible.

The following players were called up for the following 2023 UEFA European Under-17 Championship qualification matches:

 Match date: 1 November, 4 November 2022
 Opposition:  and 
 Caps and goals correct as of: 4 November 2022, after the match against .

Recent call-ups
The following players have been called up within the past twelve months or withdrew from the current squad due to injury or suspension, and remain eligible.

INJ Withdrew from the squad due to an injury
PRE Preliminary squad
WD  Withdrew for other reasons

Managerial history

Top Goalscorers
As of 4 November 2022

Players with an equal number of goals are ranked in order of average.

Notes

External links
 Football Federation of Gibraltar

European national under-17 association football teams
under-17